The 1946 Colorado A&M Aggies football team represented Colorado State College of Agriculture and Mechanic Arts in the Mountain States Conference (MSC) during the 1946 college football season.  The Aggies compiled a 2–7 record (1–5 against MSC opponents), finished sixth in the MSC, and were outscored by a total of 184 to 50.

Julius Wagner, who was in his third season as the team's head coached, resigned after five games. He was replaced by Harry W. Hughes who had been head coach from 1911 to 1941 and served as interim head coach for the final four games of the 1946 season.

Schedule

References

Colorado AandM
Colorado State Rams football seasons
Colorado AandM Aggies football